Leontius of Jerusalem was a Byzantine Christian theologian of the sixth century (and perhaps seventh century), long conflated with the more notable author of the same name, Leontius of Byzantium.

Historically, there has been a problem of misidentification between Leontius of Byzantium and Leontius of Jerusalem. The first scholar to identify and challenge the ambiguity of the writings that come down to us under the name of "Leontius" was Friedrich Loofs in 1887, arguing for a single author of the corpus leontianum. That hypothesis influenced scholarship until the publication of Marcel Richard's 1944 article Léonce de Jérusalem et Léonce de Byzance, which aimed to distinguish two figures among the works which had formerly been attributed to a single person. Since the publication of that article, Richard's conclusions have been accepted by all scholars writing about Leontius. It is therefore Richard who is responsible for establishing the identity of Leontius as an author in his own right.

The attribution of various works to one or the other Leontius has been widely accepted. Richard identified Leontius of Jerusalem as the author of Contra Monophysitas and Contra Nestorianos. To Leontius of Byzantium, on the other hand, he assigned the three books Contra Nestorianos et Eutychianos, the treatise against Severus of Antioch known as Epilysis, the Triginta capita contra Severum, and some other more minor works.

The dating of Leontius of Jerusalem's works have recently been questioned by scholars. Richard considered the two Leontii to be contemporaries living during the time of Justinian, and for decades the common opinion of scholars shared this conclusion. Certain more recent scholars, particularly Dirk Krausmüller and Carlo Dell'Osso, have broken this consensus and sided towards assigning Leontius of Jerusalem a later date than Leontius of Byzantium. 

Krausmüller has suggested that the original arguments of Loofs were correct in dating the Contra Monophysitas either between the years 568 and 680, or between 580 and 640. Based on more current scholarship and his own conclusions, Krausmüller has concluded that Leontius of Jerusalem does not belong to the reign of Justinian, as formerly supposed, but to a later date, as he must have written the Contra Nestorianos in 614 at the earliest. Dell'Osso, judging these arguments favorably, echoes Krausmüller's conclusions that Leontius of Jerusalem was a theologian of the seventh century, and based on certain similarities between the writings of this later Leontius and those of Maximus the Confessor (c. 580–662), assigns them to the same time period.

Notes and references

Further reading
 — For other persons of the name.

Byzantine theologians
Byzantine writers
Christian writers
7th-century Byzantine people
7th-century Byzantine writers
7th-century Christian theologians